Epiphryne xanthaspis is a moth in the family Geometridae and is endemic to New Zealand. This species was first described by Edward Meyrick in 1883 in an abstract and was more fully described by Meyrick in 1884.

References 

Geometridae
Moths of New Zealand
Endemic fauna of New Zealand
Moths described in 1883
Taxa named by Edward Meyrick
Endemic moths of New Zealand